Senator Godwin may refer to:

Hannibal Lafayette Godwin (1873–1929), North Carolina State Senate
Mills Godwin (1914–1999), Virginia State Senate

See also
Senator Goodwin (disambiguation)